Mosher may refer to:

People
Bob Mosher (1915–1972), American scriptwriter
Charles Adams Mosher (1906–1984), American Congressman
Edward Mosher, software developer (see Standard Generalized Markup Language)
Clelia Duel Mosher (1863–1940), author
Eliza Maria Mosher (1846–1928), American physician, educator, medical writer, inventor
Frederick C. Mosher (1913–1990), academic
Gene Mosher, author of the first graphical point of sale software 
Gregory Mosher (born 1949), stage and film director
Harry Stone Mosher, chemist
Howard Frank Mosher (1942–2017), author
James Mosher (born 1984), American visual artist
John Mosher (1928–1998), jazz double Bassist
John Mosher (writer) (1892–1942), writer and film critic
Ken Mosher, a guitarist with American indie band The Never
Lafayette F. Mosher (1824–1894), U.S. politician and judge
Leah Mosher, pilot in the Royal Canadian Air Force 
Loren Mosher (1933–2004), psychiatrist
Louis C. Mosher (1880–1958), Philippine–American War Medal of Honor recipient
Scott Mosher (born 1973), field hockey player
Sharon Mosher, American geologist
Steven W. Mosher (born 1948), political author
Terry Mosher (born 1942), cartoonist
Thomas Bird Mosher (1852–1923), publisher

Places
Mosher, Baltimore, Maryland, a neighborhood in the United States
Mosher, South Dakota, an unincorporated community

See also
John Mosher Bailey (1838–1916), US Congressman
Alfred Mosher Butts (1899–1993), inventor of Scrabble
Moshing, a type of dance
Mosh (disambiguation)